Kisela Voda is a suburb of the City of Skopje in the municipality of Kisela Voda, North Macedonia.

Demographics
According to the 2002 census, the suburb had a total of 84,625 inhabitants. Ethnic groups in the suburb include:

Macedonians 74,431
Serbs 3,738
Aromanians 987
Bosniaks 535
Turks 419
Albanians 342
Romani 324
Others  1849

References

Kisela Voda Municipality
Neighbourhoods of Skopje